The Ancient Law is a 1923 German silent drama film directed by E. A. Dupont and starring Henny Porten, Ruth Weyher and Hermann Vallentin. The son of an Orthodox Rabbi faces hostility from his father when he decides to become an actor.

Cast
Henny Porten as Archduchess Elisabeth Theresia
Ruth Weyher as court lady
Hermann Vallentin as Heinrich Laube
Avrom Morewski  (Abraham Morewski) as Rabbi Mayer
Ernst Deutsch as Baruch, his son
Grete Berger as his mother
Robert Garrison as Ruben Pick
Margarete Schlegel as Esther, his daughter
Jakob Tiedtke as Director of the Actors
Olga Limburg as his wife
Alice Hechy as second daughter
Julius Brandt as an old comedian
Fritz Richard as Nathan the professor
Wolfgang Zilzer as page
Kálmán Zátony as Joseph Wagner
Robert Scholz
Alfred Krafft-Lortzing
Dominik Löscher
Philipp Manning

References

External links

German drama films
German silent feature films
Films directed by E. A. Dupont
Films of the Weimar Republic
1923 drama films
German black-and-white films
Silent drama films
1920s German films